La tua donna (i.e. "Your Woman") is a 1954 Italian melodrama film co-written and directed by Giovanni Paolucci and starring Patricia Neal, Massimo Girotti and Lea Padovani. It grossed 63 million lire at the Italian box office.

Plot 

A politician abandons his family for social climbing. During a violent argument the man accidentally kills his wife. His political career will be destroyed.

Cast 

Patricia Neal as Countess Germana De Torri 
Massimo Girotti as Sandro Ademari
Lea Padovani as Luisa 
Alex Girotti as Sandro and Luisa's son
Enrico Viarisio	as Maurizio Bennati	
Eduardo Ciannelli 	as Public Prosecutor	
Armando Migliari	as Commendatore		
Alberto Sorrentino	as Demostene
 Michele Riccardini as Antonio
Nerio Bernardi as Defense Attorney 	
 Hilda Roberts as Hilda 	 
Alan Furlan as Tom

References

External links

1950s political drama films
Italian political drama films
1954 drama films
1954 films
Italian black-and-white films
Melodrama films
1950s Italian films
1950s Italian-language films